Kiskutas is a village in Zala County, Hungary. It has 199 inhabitants (2001).

References

External links 
 Street map 

Populated places in Zala County